Thorn (or Thoear) is a village in the municipality of Maasgouw, in the Dutch province of Limburg. It lies on the rivers Meuse and Witbeek. It is known as 'the white village' for its white-washed brick houses in the centre of town. It used to be part of the Imperial Abbey of Thorn.

History
First, the region of Thorn was a swamp nearby the Roman road between Maastricht and Nijmegen. But the region had been drained and about 975, Bishop Ansfried of Utrecht founded a Benedictine nunnery. This monastery 
developed since the 12th century into a secular stift or convent. The principal of the stift was the abbess. She was assisted by a chapter of at most twenty ladies of the highest nobility. 

Previously the abbess and the chapter were endowed with religious tasks but, since the 12th century, they served secular matters and formed the government of a truly sovereign miniature principality, the smallest independent state in the German Holy Roman Empire, approximately 250 x 250 metres. Besides Thorn, Ittervoort, Grathem, Baexem, Stramproy, Ell, Haler and Molenbeersel belonged to this principality.  After the French invasion in the winter of 1794–95 and the formal abolition in 1797 made an end to the existence of the abbey and the principality of Thorn; Thorn was first part of the department of Meuse-Inférieure, and after the Vienna Congress it became a municipality of the United Kingdom of the Netherlands.

Gallery

See also
 Thorn Abbey

References 

States and territories established in 1292
States and territories disestablished in 1797
Municipalities of the Netherlands disestablished in 2007
Populated places in Limburg (Netherlands)
Former municipalities of Limburg (Netherlands)
Maasgouw